The Taifa of Molina was a medieval Islamic taifa kingdom that existed from around the 1080s to 1100. The Taifa was ruled by the Arab tribe of Banu Khazraj which had its origin in the Hejaz region of Arabia. It was centred in the present day region of Molina de Aragón in northern Spain.

List of Emirs

Galbunid dynasty
(To Valencia: 1075–?)
'Azzun: ?–1100

See also
 List of Sunni Muslim dynasties
 Castle of Molina de Aragón

1100 disestablishments in Europe
Molina
States and territories established in the 1080s
1080s establishments in Europe